Biadeh (also Romanized as Bīādeh and Biyādeh) is a village in Hashivar Rural District, in the Central District of Darab County, Fars Province, Iran. At the 2006 census, its population was 647, in 143 families.

References 

Populated places in Darab County